Made Man is a 2006 third-person shooter video game developed by the UK company SilverBack Studios and published by Mastertronic and Aspyr for PlayStation 2 and Microsoft Windows. The game is set in the year 1972 within the New York City underworld of organized crime in the Mafia. The storyline is written by crime author David Fisher with collaboration from former mafioso Salvatore "Bill" Bonanno.

The player assumes the role of Joey Verola, a former soldier, as he is indoctrinated into the world of American organized crime and must relive his life - every moment, every kill - as he rises through the ranks to become a made man. The storyline spans three decades of his life, from the horror of Vietnam to the urban jungle of Brooklyn.

Plot
Joey (Rick Pasqualone) is forced into the world of crime when he saves a don's right-hand man in Vietnam. The game's missions are a series of flashbacks: as Joey is being driven to the don's place to be made he reveals to his nephew how he rose through the ranks.

Development
The title was originally under development at Acclaim Entertainment's Manchester studio under the name of Interview with a Made Man. When Acclaim collapsed, employees from its studio reformed as SilverBack Studios, and backed by Fund4Games, continued to work on the game. The title was shortened to Made Man and a planned Xbox conversion was dropped.

After the release of Made Man, members from the team reformed as the Manchester office of Vivendi-owned Swordfish Studios working on the console versions of World in Conflict. When, in turn, that was sold on during the Activision Blizzard merger, it became the Manchester office of MMOG developer Monumental Games.

Reception
The game has generally received negative reviews, with IGN giving the lowest score. They've given it a 2.4 out of 10 for "poor graphics, banal sound effects, and frequently absurd voice acting".

References

External links

2006 video games
Aspyr games
Organized crime video games
PlayStation 2 games
Cancelled Xbox games
Third-person shooters
Video games developed in the United Kingdom
Vietnam War video games
Video games set in New York City
Video games set in North Carolina
Video games set in Vietnam
Video games set in 1968
Video games set in 1969
Video games set in 1972
Video games set in 1974
Video games set in 1979
Video games set in 1982
Video games set in 1989
Windows games
Mastertronic games
Works about the American Mafia